Assara formosana is a species of snout moth in the genus Assara. It was described by Yoshiyasu in 1991. It is found in Taiwan and Japan.

References

Moths described in 1991
Phycitini
Moths of Japan
Moths of Taiwan